The Wiggles Movie Soundtrack is the eighth Wiggles album. It was released in 1997 and serves as the companion soundtrack for The Wiggles Movie.

Release
The Wiggles Movie Soundtrack was released in October 1997. According to ABC label manager Rex Barry, its "24th track" contains "interactive multimedia is designed specifically to educate the under-six-year-olds by simplifying the navigation and encouraging and rewarding exploration of the disc. The package features full-screen, full-motion, real-time video action footage from the film, the Wiggles themselves talking about the movie, illustrations that can be printed out for colouring in, plus a game, 'kiddie safe' Internet links and general Wiggles information."

Track listing

The Wiggly Medley includes the following songs:
 "Dorothy (Would You Like to Dance?)"
 "Fruit Salad"
 "Hot Potato"
 "Can You (Point Your Fingers and Do the Twist?)"
 "It's a Pirate Party on the Good Ship Feathersword"
 "Rock-a-Bye Your Bear"
 "Quack Quack"

Personnel
 Greg Page – vocals 
 Paul Paddick – backing vocals
 Greg Truman – backing vocals
 Carolyn Ferrie - backing vocals 
 Kevin Bennett - backing vocals
 Anthony Field – guitar
 Murray Cook – guitar, bass guitar
 Terry Murray – guitar
 David Anthony – piano on "Wally's Dream Music"
 Jeff Fatt – keyboards
 Maria Schattovits – violin
 Angela Lindsay – viola
 Margaret Lindsay – cello
 Dominic Lindsay – trumpet
 Anita Thomas – saxophones and clarinet
 Tony Henry – drums
 Peter (Fuji) Iacono – drums

Charts

Certifications

References

External links
  - entry at National Library of Australia

The Wiggles albums
1997 albums
1997 soundtrack albums